Sister Sparrow & the Dirty Birds was Sister Sparrow & the Dirty Birds's debut album, released on November 22, 2010 on Modern Vintage Recordings. It was recorded almost completely live in just one night at Avatar Studios in New York City, capturing the uniquely tight-yet-loose live sound they had honed over so many hot city nights. The album was listed as one of the top Non-Jazz Favorites for 2010 by All About Jazz. Independent Media Magazine awarded it the "Best album you probably didn't hear in 2010" in its 2010 IMM Music Awards.

Track list

References

2010 debut albums
Sister Sparrow & the Dirty Birds albums